Purmorphamine was the first small-molecule agonist developed for the protein Smoothened, a key part of the hedgehog signaling pathway, which is involved in bone growth, cardiovascular regeneration and brain development as well as having a number of other functions in the body. Purmorphamine has been shown to induce osteogenesis in bone tissue as well as influencing growth and differentiation of neurons in the brain.

References 

Receptor agonists